Qianyu Station is a transfer station of Line 2 and Line 4 of the Fuzhou Metro. It is located near the intersection of Fuma Road and Lianjiang Road, Jin'an District, Fuzhou, Fujian, China. It started operation on April 26, 2019.

Station layout

Exits

References 

Railway stations in China opened in 2019
Fuzhou Metro stations